New Image may refer to:

New Image, album by Jackie DeShannon
New Image College of Fine Arts British Columbia, New Image has expanded into independent filmmaking under the banner of production 
New Image Entertainment, under New Image College of Fine Arts British Columbia,
New Image Art